Sir Francis Cooke Caulfeild Heathcote, 9th Baronet (1868–1961) was an Anglican cleric, and 4th Bishop of New Westminster.

He was born in Northamptonshire, England and educated at Lancing College, Sussex before emigrating to Canada in 1882.  He studied at Trinity College, Toronto, and was ordained in 1891.  He was appointed Archdeacon of British Columbia in 1913 (which was changed to Archdeacon of Vancouver in 1924.  He succeeded the Most Reverend Dr Adam de Pencier as Bishop of New Westminster of the Anglican Church of Canada, located in the Lower Mainland of British Columbia, on 25 January 1941.

He died in 1961 at the age of 93.

References

https://web.archive.org/web/20071025082123/http://aabc.bc.ca/WWW.angbc.archbc/display.ANGSYNOD-614

20th-century Anglican Church of Canada bishops
Anglican archdeacons in North America
Anglican bishops of New Westminster
Baronets in the Baronetage of Great Britain
Francis
English emigrants to Canada
People educated at Lancing College
Trinity College (Canada) alumni
University of Toronto alumni
1868 births
1961 deaths